Indigenous mapping is a practice where Indigenous communities own, control, access, and possess both the geographic information and mapping processes. It is based on Indigenous data sovereignty/intellectual property.

Indigenous cartographers tend to employ different strategies than colony-focused or empire-focused cartographers. Indigenous cartography may focus on stories, ever-changing landscapes, and traditional knowledge.

Modern Indigenous mapping is closely association with decolonization. It can reclaim traditional land names and spaces, including sacred areas.

Examples 
An example of an Indigenous map is a 2.6-meter long Ojibwe scroll and story detailing the 14th-15th century emigration of the Ojibwe people. It tracks the tribe's journey their original territory in the Zhiiwitaagani-gichigami (Atlantic Ocean) to the Nayaano-nibiimaang Gichigamiin (Great Lakes). The story uses symbols, such as bird migration and a bear carrying a pack of life and coming across different lakes with his tongue, to portray geographic locations including the St. Lawrence River to Montreal, the Lachine Rapids to Mattawa, the French River to Lake Huron, through the Straits of Mackinac to Sault Ste. Marie. The scroll was created and the story was retold by Eshkwaykeeshik (James Red Sky).

See also
Indigenous land rights
Indigenous language
Indigenous rights
Indigenous title
Language revitalization

References

Cartography
Decolonization
Indigenous land rights
Indigenous rights
Indigenous politics
Social movements